Vasile Mirza (born 26 July 1943) is a Romanian boxer. He competed in the men's light middleweight event at the 1964 Summer Olympics.

References

1943 births
Living people
Romanian male boxers
Olympic boxers of Romania
Boxers at the 1964 Summer Olympics
Sportspeople from Cluj-Napoca
Light-middleweight boxers